The  is a fictional manned robot (mecha), introduced in 1979 in Yoshiyuki Tomino's and Sunrise's anime series Mobile Suit Gundam. In the series, it is a prototype weapon for the Earth Federation when it falls into the hands of Amuro Ray, the son of its designer in story (Tem Ray), who goes on to pilot it in the Earth Federation's war against the Principality of Zeon.

As the success of the series began the Gundam franchise, the robot's design was the first of many variations in subsequent works. The design appearing in Mobile Suit Gundam serves as the iconic symbol of the Gundam franchise and sparked the creation of its multiple sequels and spinoffs.

Character design
The RX-78's initial concept was that of a powered armor, the primary design for Yoshiyuki Tomino's proposed series Freedom Fighter Gunboy. The series later changed its name to Mobile Suit Gundam and Kunio Okawara was given Tomino's concept to shape into a finalized design for the anime. Okawara created multiple designs before settling on the current, samurai-styled design for the anime in 1979.

Enemies in the series regularly refer to the RX-78-2 as the white suit or the White Devil (due to the suit's formidable battle performance) while it is a mix of blue, red, and white.  Tomino's response in the novel version of Gundam is that the original design was to be a grayscale machine, made up of mostly white and light gray colouring.  However, Sunrise disapproved of the colouring and insisted the unit to be painted in brighter colours to attract attention, like other super robot anime at that time.

The "original" Gundam, the RX-78-2 design was to be the second unit in a line of eight prototype high-performance assault-type mobile suits. The preceding Gundam model RX-78-1 and the subsequent model RX-78-3 were designed by Okawara between 1980 and 1983 for Gundam Century and Mobile Suit Variations and the latter appeared in the novel version as the G-3 Gundam after the original Unit 2 was destroyed in battle. The fourth to seventh Gundam is designed by Okawara in 1989 for Kunio Okawara collection, also known as M-MSV(Missing Mobile Suit Variation).  Other mechanical designers later added further design variations; including Yutaka Izubuchi's RX-78NT-1, designed in 1989 for the OVA series Mobile Suit Gundam 0080: War in the Pocket, and Shoji Kawamori's and Hajime Katoki's Gundam Development Project designs in 1992 for Gundam 0083.

The RX-78-2 has also been redesigned several times by other artists.  In particular, Hajime Katoki's version of the Gundam (referred to as Ver. Ka) has become popular enough to be made into both injection plastic model kits sold by Bandai and resin-based garage kits sold by their B-Club subsidiary. Okawara himself redesigned the Gundam for original character designer Yoshikazu Yasuhiko's manga Mobile Suit Gundam: The Origin, a retelling of the events of the original series.  Though mostly identical to the original, it features slightly different designs for its weapons, a small Vulcan pod in its shoulder, and the ability to replace one of the beam sabers stored in its backpack with a cannon similar to that of the RX-77 Guncannon. In addition, the 15th installment of the Gundam Evolve series of shorts features another variation on the RX-78's design, a highly stylized version of the iconic machine based on "modern" design aesthetics. It has been referred as Ver. Evolve 15.

The continuing popularity in Japan of this mobile suit has led Bandai to create a 1.5m tall model version, which went on sale in Japan in 2007.

The Japan Self-Defense Forces built an approximately full scale RX-78-3 Gundam with styrofoam in its show and contains a simulation pod.

Gundam Expo (Hong Kong) uses the RX-78-2's last shooting scene in its logo's X.

Role in plot

The deployment of the Principality of Zeon's highly agile mobile suits, the MS-05 Zaku I and the MS-06 Zaku II, in the early phase of the One Year War had given the small nation a major tactical edge over the much larger Earth Federation.  Due to the widespread use of the Minovsky particles, which interfered with radio transmissions and rendered beyond-visual-range missiles useless, space warfare was reduced to direct fire barrages between large starships and spacefighter dogfights.  The Zakus, capable of propellant-less maneuvering thanks to their AMBAC systems and able to be retrofitted to suit a variety of missions and environments, easily outclassed the Federation's arsenal of conventional space fighters and laid waste to the Federation armada of dreadnought space warships.  Realizing that the gap needed to be closed, the Federation instituted Project V (short for "Project Victory"), a development program that would produce a counterpart Federation mobile suit design, with the capability for mass-production a mandatory requirement.  While the ultimate result of the program was the mass-produced RGM-79 GM series, the high-performance RX-78 series prototypes served as the main testbed for the Project V engineers to trial several new design concepts that proved profoundly influential for the coming decades.  Some of the developments in the RX-78 models were later incorporated into the GM line, but many were scrapped due to cost and/or complexity.

Only eight RX-78 suits were produced during the One Year War, although continual remodelling and upgrading created the impression that there were more than eight units.  Although the RX-78 suits are designated RX-78-1 to RX-78-8, the final digit indicated the design version of the unit, rather than its actual number.

In addition, the Earth Federation Forces started a G-4 project which consist of four RX-78s for each of its branches, and EFSF (Earth Federation Space Force) used information of the RX-78-4 to develop the RX-78NT-1.  According to the director's production notes of Mobile Suit Gundam 0080: War in the Pocket, it could be considered to be the 9th unit of RX-78, initially intended to be used by Amuro Ray.  Although what unit the EFAF (EF Air Force) developed is not specifically mentioned, in the semi-canon manga Mobile Suit Gundam: MS Generation the EFAF created the RX-78E (GT FOUR/Gundam Transformer/Flight & Operations Unifications Reactors), which is different from the eight RX-78s produced. Another unit is the EFGF's (EF Ground Force) RX-78XX, which uses scrap parts of the RX-78s, just like the RX-79[G] Gundam Ground Combat Type.  The EFN (EF Navy) developed the RAG-79-G1 as the G-4 project's marine type Gundam, yet it is only an upgrade of the RAG-79 Aqua GM for Ace pilots with just the head and generator changed. After the One Year War, the GP series are numbered after the RX-78 convention, despite being newly produced units.

The variation among the Gundams was originally indicated by differences in colouration, indicating upgrades to completely internal equipment and technology, although later variants displayed externally visible upgrades. For example, Unit 4 and Unit 5, which exist mainly in games and as model kits, provide additional mounting points and weaponry.

The RX-78 series introduced Minovsky particle beam weaponry to mobile suits, developing and deploying the first successful beam rifle and beam saber.  These would form the primary component of mobile suit weaponry for at least the next hundred and fifty years.  The core block system was also introduced in the RX-78, as well as the RX-75 Guntank and RX-77 Guncannon.  This system allowed the pilot to escape the destruction of his mobile suit in a functional aerospace fighter, as well as housing a learning computer that can collect and analyze performance data from the suit's combat sorties and self-adapt for improvement.  This however had to be dropped from subsequent mass-production units due to cost issues. However, it was reused on occasion (most notably in the Anaheim Electronics MSZ-010 ZZ Gundam during the First Neo Zeon War), and later resurrected in UC 0153 by the League Militaire on the LM312V04 Victory Gundam.

After the end of the One Year War, the Federation opened up a black op mobile suit development program, the Gundam Development Project, in order to develop mobile suits to fill roles that had appeared in analysis of combat operations from the One Year War.  After the events of Gundam 0083, all details of the Gundam Development Project were erased from the official records.

The RX-78 line was finally superseded in UC 0087 by the RX-178 Gundam Mk-II, developed by the Titans counterinsurgency taskforce.

Notable variations

RX-78NT-1 Gundam NT-1 "Alex"
Primary Mobile Suit featured in the 1989 OVA Mobile Suit Gundam 0080: War in the Pocket, designed by Yutaka Izubuchi. The first direct variant of the RX-78 to be animated, it helped pave the way for the appearance of other variants, such as those from Mobile Suit Gundam 0083: Stardust Memory, as pivotal elements of the plot. In War in the Pocket, the Alex was developed to replace the RX-78-2 and optimized for the increased reaction time of Newtypes, though its test pilot Christina MacKenzie was not a Newtype herself. With its panoramic cockpit, the Alex serves as a retconned technological link between the original series and Mobile Suit Zeta Gundam.

Offensively, the Alex sports large multi-barreled cannons concealed beneath the blue pods on either arm in addition to a pair of small Vulcan guns mounted on the head and the ubiquitous backpack-stored beam sabers. It was also to be equipped with a beam rifle and shield, but they were not completed by the time the Alex was ready.

The Alex could be outfitted with a Chobham armour shell that offered extra protection. Its data would be used for the GM Custom. The Chobham armour design would be used to reinforce the body of the GM Cannon II. Both of these later GM's appear in Gundam 0083, further bridging the gap between the original series and Zeta Gundam.

The Alex only sortied twice, and was severely damaged days before the One Year War ended.

Gundam Mk-II

The RX-178 Gundam Mark-II is a fictional mobile suit from the Universal Century Gundam anime series.  A collaborative design created by Kunio Okawara, Mamoru Nagano, and Kazumi Fujita, it is featured prominently as protagonist Kamille Bidan's mobile suit in the first half of Mobile Suit Zeta Gundam, and used by various secondary characters throughout the rest of that series and its sequel, Mobile Suit Gundam ZZ. It has appeared in a number of other media, including the PlayStation 2 title Mobile Suit Gundam: AEUG Vs Titans, the multi-platform title Dynasty Warriors: Gundam, the Super Robot Wars series, and PSP title Gundam Battle Royale, among many others.

In Mobile Suit Zeta Gundam

The RX-178 Gundam Mk-II are three prototype mobile suits developed by the Titans, an elite special unit of the Earth Federation forces, in UC 0087 - the first Gundam units seen in Mobile Suit Zeta Gundam. Aside from a new paint job of dark blue and black with red and yellow highlights, the Gundam Mk. II bears great aesthetic similarities to its One Year War-era predecessor, the original RX-78-2 Gundam from Mobile Suit Gundam. The Mk. II represented a small increase in mobility compared to the original, and with the deletion of the cumbersome and expensive core block system, room was freed upon for a more modern panoramic cockpit setup (a more or less standard accoutrement for mobile suits in the same series and time period), which is designed to offer increased situational awareness to the pilot. Armaments are fairly standard Gundam fare, including a beam rifle (chronologically speaking, the Mk. II's beam rifle was the first of such weapons to be powered by a replaceable e-pac device; this was later retconned with Gundam 0083) and twin beam sabers. Vulcan guns are not installed in the Mk. II by default, unlike previous models; however, an optional set can be added as an ejectable pod. The Mk. II may also arm a "clay bazooka" weapon, which is capable of disabling a mobile suit's mobility via an adhesive warhead (though it can equip normal explosive shells if desired). Aside from the aforementioned mundane enhancements, the Mk. II's most substantial contribution to mobile suit technology and largest upgrade over its predecessor is the then-revolutionary movable frame construction, which later inspired the designs in the novel Gundam Sentinel.  Paradoxically, the Gundam Mk. II is not armored with the wonderfully durable Gundarium alloy material, first introduced in the series on the original RX-78 Gundam, making it no more or less physically durable than mass-production mobile suits of the era (the term Gundarium is a creation of the Zeta Gundam series; formerly, the same material was known as "Lunar Titanium" in Mobile Suit Gundam, and was renamed (or retconned from a meta standpoint) in honor of the original Gundam).

Further development by the Titans was delayed indefinitely following a raid by the Anti Earth Union Group operatives (led by the incognito Zeon One Year War ace Char Aznable, alias Quattro Bajeena) where all three units were stolen from the Titans' headquarters at Green Noa II (effectively kicking off the Gryps Conflict that forms the background plot of Mobile Suit Zeta Gundam).  Launched from the carrier warship Argama, this "Gundam Heist" also netted the AEUG the powerful Newtype Kamille Bidan, who would become the Mk. II's chief operator, as well as initiating the series-long conflict between Kamille and Titans pilot Jerid Messa. Of note, this act marked the first "Stolen Gundam" plot event in the franchise, which has become more common in recent years (e.g. the RX-78GP-02A in Gundam 0083 or nearly the entire starting Gundam cast in Gundam SEED series).

Though an initial boon against Titans mobile suits (as well as even more outdated Earth Federation designs, some of which were One Year War-era Zeon models confiscated after the war), the Mk. II's limited capabilities become quite apparent by the time the plot develops to the Jaburo drop operation (starting in episode 11, Entering the Atmosphere), where even the Titans' new mass-produced RMS-108 Marasai mobile suits featured Gundarium alloy armoring. The Mk. II's shortcomings are mitigated, to an extent, by the attachment of the G-Defenser armor booster, constructed by Anaheim Electronics. When combined with the G-Defenser, the Mk. II's mobility is increased via numerous additional thrusters, its vulnerabilities are somewhat reduced with additional armor plating, and its offensive capabilities are boosted significantly – new weapons include a heavy beam rifle and a battery of missile launchers, among others. Additionally, the G-Defenser itself is constructed with Gundarium alloy armor, boosting the protective value of the areas covered on the Mk. II's body. This configuration, known as the "Super Gundam", enables the Mk. II to remain relatively competitive against all but the highest-performing Titans mobile suits, such as the RX-193 Hambrabi.

Kamille would eventually abandon the Mk. II (episode 21, A Sign of Zeta) when the titular MSZ-006 Z Gundam, which Kamille helped design, is completed and delivered to the Argama (this also marks the first "mid-season upgrade" in the protagonist's mobile suit selection, which has since become a staple of the Gundam franchise). The Mk. II is then used by former Titans pilot Emma Sheen, who defected episodes earlier, before the Jaburo drop operation. Katz Kobayashi takes up operating the G-Defenser, and the two form a competent and effective team in utilizing the "Super Gundam".

In the movie trilogy's trailer, it shows the Gundam Mk. II launched with a Long Beam Rifle, but flies separately with G-Defenser, which shows Gundam Mk. II has an ability to use Long Beam Rifle on its own, though Emma did not fire a single shot in Mk. II mode.

Media

Pop culture

The appearance of the unit is not limited to Gundam series. RX-78-2 Gundam is one of the basic units that appear in the Super Robot Wars series, ever since the first game for the Game Boy. The RX-78-2 also makes multiple cameo appearances in the anime Sgt. Frog.

The current Bandai Universal Century models' label copyright classification also uses the head of the Gundam as its icon.

Pepsi released several series of Pepsi bottles with special-edition bottle caps featuring miniature statues of various mobile suits from the many Gundam anime released over the years. The RX-78 was one of three of these designs (the other two being both the normal Zaku and Char's red Zaku) to have multiple miniatures released during the first promotional campaign, including both a full-body sculpture and a sculpture of its bust.

On October 23, 2000, Japan included the RX-78 Gundam and Amuro Ray in the 20th Century Stamp Series. This mobile suit and other notable machines from various Gundam series were also recognized in the second set of "Anime Heroes and Heroines" stamps, released in 2005. Other franchises and series included were Pokémon, Galaxy Express 999, and Detective Conan.

The RX-78-2 Gundam & 2 Medea transport planes were featured in a fire fighting poster in Japan. The RX-78-2 was equipped with water spraying equipment instead of weapons.

According to Gundam-san 4 koma comic, the Mitsubishi Lancer Evolution appearance is influenced by the RX-78-2 Gundam.

Pocky released a series called Pocky Gunpla Bag that contains a small plastic model in it. One of them is the RX-78-2 Gundam. The target customers of this product is 30-year-old male.

In 2008, an ink and wash painting of Gundam drawn by Hisashi (天明屋 尚) in 2005 was sold in the Christie's auction held in Hong Kong with a price of $600,000 (USD).

An 18-meter life-size version of the Gundam was built in 2009 to commemorate the franchise's 30 year anniversary. The project is in response to the 30th Anniversary of Gundam as well as a fund raising project for Green Tokyo, a project preparing Tokyo in terms of the bid for 2016 Olympic Games with the theme of a Green Olympic. The statue itself is depicted in the 2010 anime Model Suit Gunpla Builders Beginning G. After an appearance at Bandai's headquarters in Shizuoka from late 2010 to March 2011, it was erected again at the new Gundam Front Tokyo theme attraction on Odaiba, opening in July 2012 until March 2013.

On July 16, 2010, ANA launched a series of flights as part of the 30th anniversary of Gunpla. Called the "ANA x GUNDAM Sky Project," the promotion used specially painted Boeing 777s on domestic and international flights. The initial flight was from Tokyo to Osaka. Passengers were also given the chance to buy HGUC 1/144 and 1/48 MegaScale kits of the RX-78-2 Gundam painted in ANA colors aboard the flight. It was scheduled to end in March 2011, but was extended to June 30, 2011. The promotion was expanded to offer special 1/144 versions of the 00 Raiser and the Gundam Unicorn.

The RX-78-2 Gundam appeared in Steven Spielberg's film Ready Player One (2018), where one of the protagonists controls a full size Gundam replica during the climactic battle in a virtual reality environment, where it, and its ally The Iron Giant is used to battle the antagonist's Mechagodzilla.

The Gundam was featured on the online series Death Battle and was pitted up against the Autobot leader Optimus Prime and lost due to the Autobot being more skilled, having far superior feats and better weapons.

Statues
On March 23, 2008, a bronze statue of the Gundam was erected at the south entrance of Kami-Igusa Station in Suginami, Tokyo to honor the hometown animation studio Sunrise.

As part of the 30th Anniversary of the Gundam series, the company officially announced a project on March 11, 2009, called Real-G planning to build a 1:1 real size scale Gundam in Japan. It was completed on June 9, 2009, and displayed in a Tokyo park. The 18-meter tall statue was later moved and reconstructed in Shizuoka City, where it stayed from July 2010 to March 2011. In August it was dismantled and reconstructed in Odaiba, Tokyo on April 19, 2012. Until March 5, 2017, it stood in Odaiba along with a gift shop called "Gundam Front Tokyo".

On March 5, it was announced that the life size RX 78-2 Gundam will be replaced by another life size statue of the RX 0 Unicorn Gundam from Mobile Suit Gundam Unicorn.

A second statue based on the original Gundam was announced in late 2018 as part of the "Gundam global challenge" made to receive concepts for an animatronic version. The statue finished construction in 2020 and opened to the public on December 19, 2020

Theme park attraction "Gundam Crisis" and "Gundam Front Tokyo"
The RX-78-2 Gundam had a full 1:1 scale mock-up constructed for the theme park attraction Gundam Crisis. It costs 800 yen to go into the attraction and the attraction is basically a game where the players have to complete about eight different missions within 8 minutes (1 minute per mission) in order to access the cockpit. If successful, players are shown a special, Gundam-related video inside the cockpit.

The statue stood in Odaiba, Tokyo, outside the shopping mall Diver City Tokyo, where it was a centerpiece of the "Gundam Front Tokyo" attraction until March 5, 2017. Visitors could visit the statue and also see the Gundam Front Tokyo attraction on the sixth floor of the mall, which featured a 360 degree panoramic movie theater, a room dedicated to Gundam models throughout the years, much concept artwork, and a life-size 1/1 scale bust of the Strike Freedom Gundam from the show Gundam SEED. The nearby hotel, Grand Nikko Tokyo Daiba (formerly Grand Pacific le Daiba) had a Gundam themed hotel room during this time.

Other Mk-II appearances and beyond 
The concept of Isuzu VX 2 is inspired by RX-178 Gundam Mk-II as concept design arts released in the Jan/Feb 1998, as seen in issue no. 71 of the magazine Axis published in Japan.

The Mk. II appeared years before the official North American release of Z Gundam on the talk show Late Night with Conan O'Brien in a commercial bumper. Featured on an episode originally aired on September 30, 1998, the "Conan Mk. II" was formed from a Mk. II model kit altered with O'Brien's face, and a cartoon-like head on the shield, as typical of Late Night bumpers of the period. Zeta Gundam was not officially released in the North American market by Bandai until 2004. Late Night graphical designer Pierre Bernard is a self-stated anime enthusiast, though if he specifically created the "Conan Mk. II" bumper has not been confirmed by any official source.

As with most mobile suits from Zeta Gundam, the Gundam Mk. II (and its Super form) received 1:144 and 1/100 scale model kits in 1987, along with a 1:220 scale "pocket model" (scaled to match large Z Gundam mobile suit kits, such as the MRX-009 Psyco Gundam). In 1994, the Mk. II was featured in the limited-run 1:144 High Grade series (not to be confused with the later HGUC, or High Grade Universal Century, series), along with the original RX-78 Gundam and the Mk-II's successor MSZ-006 Zeta Gundam. With the 1:144-scale HGUC lineup, launched in 2000, the Mk. II has seen very heavy coverage. The Mk. II was released as a stand-alone model in May 2002 (in AEUG and Titans colors), with the G-Defenser in "Super Gundam" configuration in November 2002, a limited production (now discontinued) collector's "extra finish" version in May 2005, with the Flying Armor re-entry vehicle later that month, and as part of the "Gryphios War" 3-pack with the Zeta Gundam and MSN-00100 Hyaku Shiki in March 2006. The Mk. II joined the 1/100-scale Master Grade lineup in August 1998, in both AEUG and Titans colors. A Master Grade "Super Gundam" kit with the G-Defenser was issued in January 1999, Totally re-designed versions of the Master Grade Mk. IIs were released in October 2005 (AEUG version) and March 2006 (Titans version), concurrent with the releases of the second and third Zeta Gundam movie compilations respectively. Finally, the Gundam Mk. II was inducted into the enormous 1:60-scale Perfect Grade line in November 2001, and again in Titans colors in July 2002. In May 2012, Gundam Mk. II (AEUG) & Gundam Mk. II (TITANS) was introduced into the new 1/144-scale Real Grade model kit series.

See also
 Gundam
 Gundam model
 Mobile Suit Gundam

References

External links
 RX-78-2 Gundam at the MechaBay
Gundam Mk. II at GundamOfficial.com
Super Gundam at GundamOfficial.com
Gundam Mk. II at MAHQ
Super Gundam at MAHQ
Zeta Gundam plot synopsis at GundamOfficial.com
Zeta Gundam at the Gundam Project (archive courtesy of the Wayback Machine).
(2002-5-6) Gundam: The Official Guide. Mark Simmons. 
(2002-5-10) Gundam Technical Manual #3: Stardust Memories. Yoshiyuki Tomino. 

Gundam
Fictional weapons
Fictional mecha